Pomona High School (or PHS) is a high school (secondary school) operated by the Pomona Unified School District (PUSD) in California, located in North Pomona at 475 Bangor St. In 2002 and 2003, the Pomona High School football team won the Valle Vista League championship.

Athletics

On December 5, 2014, the varsity football team won the CIF Southern Section football championship. Pomona High defeated Paraclete High School by a score of 37-29 to win its first CIF-SS championship since 1951.

Notable alumni

Hamza Abdullah, NFL player
Husain Abdullah, NFL player and younger brother of Hamza 
Doug Bird, Major League Baseball Pitcher
Tank Collins, former expatriate professional basketball player
Torri Edwards, sprinter
Jerry Green, expatriate professional basketball player
Marty Keough, Professional Baseball Player
Lila Kiser, model
Sugar Shane Mosley, boxer
Bob Seagren, Pole vault Olympic Gold/Silver Medalist/actor/entrepreneur
Bill Singer, former MLB player
Dedrique Taylor, Cal State Fullerton Head Basketball Coach
Delanie Walker, NFL player
Jimmy Verdon NFL player, College Coach
 Janeene Vickers, sprinter
Azeem Victor NFL Player
Bob Hargrove, All-State Wrestler, All American Linebacker
Walter Knott, grower of the Boysenberry and founder of Knott's Berry Farm in Buena Park

References

External links

High schools in Los Angeles County, California
Valle Vista League
Public high schools in California
Buildings and structures in Pomona, California
Education in Pomona, California
1900s establishments in California